Sir Henry Capell (1505– 1 February 1558) of Ubley, Somerset was an English politician.

He was born the son of Sir Giles Capell of Rayne, Essex. His grandfather was Sir William Capel, twice Lord Mayor of London. He inherited his Ubley estate on the death of his mother c.1512. He was knighted in 1533 of the occasion of the coronation of Anne Boleyn.

He was a Member (MP) of the Parliament of England for Somerset in 1547.

He married Anne Manners, daughter of Anne St. Leger and George Manners, 11th Baron de Ros. They had several children who died in his lifetime. He died in London in 1558 and was buried at St Bartholomew-by-the-Exchange alongside his grandfather. His assets devolved to his brother Edward.

References

1505 births
1558 deaths
English MPs 1547–1552